Vandavasi was a Lok Sabha (Parliament of India) constituency in Tamil Nadu. After delimitation in 2009, it is defunct.

Assembly segments
Vandavasi Lok Sabha constituency was composed of the following assembly segments:
Tiruvannamalai (moved to Tiruvannamalai constituency after 2009)
Polur (moved to Arani constituency after 2009)
Vandavasi (SC) (moved to Arani constituency after 2009)
Peranamallur
Melmalayanur
Gingee  (moved to Arani constituency after 2009)

Members of the Parliament

Election results

General Election 1999

General Election 1998

General Election 1996

General Election 1991

General Election 1989

General Election 1984

General Election 1980

General Election 1977

General Election 1971

General Election 1967

General Election 1962

See also
 Vandavasi
 List of Constituencies of the Lok Sabha

References

External links
 Election Commission of India -http://www.eci.gov.in/StatisticalReports/ElectionStatistics.asp

Former Lok Sabha constituencies of Tamil Nadu
Former constituencies of the Lok Sabha
2008 disestablishments in India
Constituencies disestablished in 2008